Gonnoi (before 1927: Δερελί - Dereli) is a former municipality in the Larissa regional unit, Thessaly, Greece. Since the 2011 local government reform it is part of the municipality Tempi, of which it is a municipal unit. Population 2,462 (2011). The municipal unit has an area of 113.333 km2. The municipality was created under the Kapodistrias Law in 1997 out of the former communes of Gonnoi, Kallipefki, Itea and Elaia.

Subdivisions
The municipal unit Gonnoi is subdivided into the following communities (constituent villages in brackets):
Gonnoi (Gonnoi, Elaia)
Itea
Kallipefki

Population

History
The ancient city of Gonnoi was situated in a hillside near the contemporary Gonnoi, now called "Kastri" (i.e. castle). The area was consecutively ruled by the Kingdom of Macedonia, the Roman, the Byzantine and the Ottoman Empires. With most of Thessaly, Gonnoi became a part of Greece in 1881.

See also
List of settlements in the Larissa regional unit

References

External links
 Official website
 Gonnoi (municipality) on GTP Travel Pages
 Gonnoi (town) on GTP Travel Pages

Geography of ancient Thessaly
Populated places in Larissa (regional unit)